Richard Claremont (born 3 May 1965) is a Wollongong-based  Australian painter. His style is expressionistic and related to impressionism. Claremont worked for the Australia Post from  1988 to 2017 and made sketches while delivering mail. He became known as 'the painting postie' in media.

Early life and education 
Claremont was born on 3 May 1965 in Sydney. He attended Glenaeon Rudolf Steiner School. While at school he worked at Sydney's Artflow Graphics studio but decided to study Visual Arts instead of Graphic Design and entered Sydney College of the Arts where he studied from 1983 to 1985.
Claremont displayed his works in a group exhibition of 4 painters from the College in 1985, earning a positive review from The Sydney Morning Herald's art critic John McDonald. 
Between 1985 and 1987 he travelled throughout Europe, the Middle East and North America, staying in Canada for two years.

Art career 
In 1988, Claremont returned to Australia and started working for Australia Post as a postman serving City of Shellharbour area. What started as a summer job, became his main occupation for almost thirty years. Claremont found inspiration on the city streets, making sketches while delivering mail. In 2015 he won ANL Maritime Art Prize awarded by The Mission to Seafarers. Claremont's works are on permanent display at Bluescope Visitors Centre at Port Kembla. He was also one of Australia's contemporary artists featured at Donald Keys' Art Heads series of portraits.

Awards

Exhibitions

References

External links 

1965 births
Living people
Australian contemporary painters
Artists from Sydney
Australian landscape painters
University of Sydney alumni